Fox Movies is a Portuguese pay television movie channel owned by Fox Networks Group Portugal. It was launched on 1 July 2011.

Programming
The channel airs the most recent and successful movies airing many genres including drama, comedy, science fiction, action and horror. Programming during the summer slate included hits such as X-Men and The Queen.

References

External links
Official website 

Movie channels in Portugal
Fox Networks Group
Portugal
Television stations in Portugal
Portuguese-language television stations
Television channels and stations established in 2011